NM23-LV (also known as NME1-NME2) is a human gene.

The NME1-NME2 mRNA is a naturally occurring co-transcribed product of the neighboring NME1 and NME2 genes. The significance of this co-transcribed mRNA and the function of its predicted protein product have not yet been determined. 

Alternative splicing of this gene results in different transcript variants encoding distinct isoforms, but the full-length nature of each variant has not been defined.

References

Further reading